The Arrow Rock Ferry Landing had significance by 1821, when Santa Fe bound trading caravans departing from Franklin began crossing at the ferry.

It was listed on the National Register of Historic Places in 2013.

The site can be visited.  A trail from the site goes up onto private property however.

Also listed on the National Register are other sites associated with the historic Santa Fe Trail.

References

Historic districts on the National Register of Historic Places in Missouri
National Register of Historic Places in Saline County, Missouri
Santa Fe Trail
Ferry terminals on the National Register of Historic Places
Crossings of the Missouri River